Daru  is the capital of the Western Province of Papua New Guinea and a former Catholic bishopric. Daru town falls under the jurisdiction of Daru Urban LLG.
 
The township is entirely located on an island that goes by the same name, which is located near the mouth of the Fly River on the western side of the Gulf, just north of Torres Strait and Far North Queensland in Australia. Daru had a recorded population of 15,142 as of the 2011 census.

Population 
The language of the Daru people is Kiwai (South-West Coastal Kiwai), also spoken on neighbouring mainland villages (the name Kiwai comes from Kiwai Island some 60 km north-east in the Fly River delta). However, the Kiwai settlement of Daru is fairly recent. The original inhabitants, the Hiamo, were Western-Central Torres Strait Islanders originally from Yama in the Torres Strait. With the Kiwai colonisations, the main group of Hiamo people moved to Southern Torres Strait and settled the (Inner) Muralag group.

Religion 
Its St. Louis de Montfort Co-Cathedral is the 'second see' (and former 'full' cathedral) of the Roman Catholic Diocese of Daru-Kiunga (renamed in 1987, originally Apostolic Prefecture of Daru since 1957, promoted diocese in 1966).

Transport 
It is served by Daru Airport, a small airstrip.

Climate
Daru has a tropical monsoon climate (Köppen Am) with heavy rainfall most of the year and low rainfall from July to October.

See also

Notes and references 

Populated places in the Western Province (Papua New Guinea)
Populated places established in 1884
1884 establishments in Oceania